The 44th Canadian Parliament includes a record number of female Members of Parliament, with 103 women elected to the 338-member House of Commons of Canada (30.5%) in the 2021 election. Of those 103 women, 22 were elected for the first time in the 2021 election. This represents a gain of five seats over the previous record of 98 women elected at the beginning of the 43rd Canadian Parliament, and a gain of three seats from the record high of 100 women during the previous parliamentary session following by-elections.

By contrast, the 117th United States Congress had 119 elected women sitting in the 435-seat United States House of Representatives (27.3%).

The 2021 election represented the highest proportion of women ever on the ballot.

Party standings

Female members

† denotes women who were newly elected in the 2021 election and are serving their first term in office.
†† denotes women who were newly elected in by-elections following the 2021 election.

Accessibility to office and equal representation 
The Canadian Parliament has seen a dramatic increase in the number of women and racialized people that sit in the House of Commons in the last decade. However, the representation of women in the House has not always been key to the government's success. In 1921, the first federal election where the majority of women could vote took place. This was also the year that the very first woman was elected to sit in the House. Although four women ran, only one was elected: Agnes Campbell Macphail.

The 2021 Canadian election once again set a record for the proportion of women candidates; 582 women or gender diverse candidates ran in that year's election, accounting for 43% of all nominees across the five major parties.

One of the largest reasons why there is not a  higher percentage of female candidates is because of the barriers to entry that they face. According to the Library of the Canadian Parliament, there are seven key factors that contribute to the barriers to entry that women face: gender stereotypes and discrimination, lack of confidence in their abilities, insufficient efforts to recruit female candidates, difficulties in financing their campaigns, absence of family-friendly and gender-sensitive workplaces, gender-based violence and harassment, and gender-biased media treatment. These seven reasons, identified by the Government of Canada, are the issues that must be addressed if equality is to be achieved in representation. Newman et al. noted similar barriers to entry for women into the political landscape in Canada.

Female representation in Canada compared to international and provincial representation 
The number of women in the Canadian Parliament has been slowly but steadily increasing since the 1980s and has reached its highest point following the 2021 Canadian federal election where women made up 30.5% of the Canadian House of Commons, higher than the global average of 25.7% and surpassing the 1995 United Nations goal of 30% female representation in government. In terms of gender representation in government, Canada outperforms a country like the United States in which the House of Representatives is made up of 27.4% women. However, in a country where women make up a slim majority of the population at 50.4% as of 2010, the 43rd Canadian Parliament still falls short when it comes to achieving gender parity in government. Canada also currently ranks 53rd in the world in gender representation in government which is behind the United Kingdom, Sweden, and Rwanda. However, with prominent Canadian political parties like the Liberal Party pledging to include more female representation in government as well as parties like the New Democratic Party putting forward a slate made up of 52% women or gender diverse candidates in the 2021 election, there is significant political pressure to increase the number of women representatives in government.

Canadian provinces and territories come much closer to achieving gender parity in their Legislative Assemblies than their federal counterparts. Similar to the rest of Canada in the province of Ontario women make up a little over half of the population at 50.7% but unlike the rest of Canada 35.5% of Ontario Members of the Legislative Assembly are women. In Quebec, a province where women make up 50.4% of the population, gender parity is even closer to being achieved with women making up 42.4% of the National Assembly. The Northwest Territory has come the closest to achieving gender parity with women making up 48.3% of the population and 47.3% of the Legislative Assembly. The Northwest Territories are also currently the only province or territory in Canada that has a female Premier, Caroline Cochrane.

See also
Women in the 41st Canadian Parliament
Women in the 42nd Canadian Parliament
Women in the 43rd Canadian Parliament

Notes

References

Parliament, 42
43rd Canadian Parliament